Rear Admiral Mohammad Mozammel Haque OSP, NUP, ndc, psc is a retired two-star admiral in Bangladesh Navy who served as the Assistant Chief of Naval Staff (Personnel). Prior to join here, he was Commander of Chattogram Naval Area (COMCHIT). Prior to assumption of the Commander Chattogram Naval Area on 4th February 2020, he served as Chairman of Mongla Port Authority.

Early life and education 
Haque joined Bangladesh Naval Academy as Officer Cadet on 15 April 1982. and successfully commissioned in the Executive Branch in Bangladesh Navy on 15 April 1985. He also obtained B.Sc. (Hons.) from Behria University, Lahore, Pakistan and Masters in Strategic and Development Studies (MSDS) from Bangladesh University of Professionals (BUP) both with 1st Class. He completed PSC from  Defence Services Command and Staff College and NDC from National Defence College (NDC) Dhaka, Bangladesh.

Career 
Mozammel Haque served as the commander of Khulna Naval area, another important appointment before he joined at Mongla Port Authority as of its chairman. This was his first appointment after being promoted to Rear Admiral from Commodore. He became chairman of Bangladesh Inland Water Transport Authority (BIWTA) on 1 March 2015.

References 

Bangladesh Navy personnel
Bangladeshi Navy admirals
Bangladesh Navy
Year of birth missing (living people)
Living people
National Defence College (Bangladesh) alumni